Meat + Bone is the ninth studio album by American punk blues band Jon Spencer Blues Explosion, released in 2012.  Their previous album Damage came out in 2004.

Reception
 

Meat + Bone received generally positive reviews from critics. At Metacritic, which assigns a rating out of 100 to reviews from mainstream critics, the album received an average score of 75 based on 22 reviews, which indicates "generally favorable reviews".

Track listing
 Black Mold  
 Bag of Bones  
 Boot Cut  
 Get Your Pants Off  
 Ice Cream Killer  
 Strange Baby  
 Bottle Baby  
 Danger  
 Black Thoughts  
 Unclear  
 Bear Trap  
 Zimgar

References 

2012 albums
Jon Spencer Blues Explosion albums